Mihrdat IV (Latinized as Mithridates), of the Chosroid Dynasty, was the king of Iberia (Kartli, eastern Georgia) from c. 409 to 411.

He was the son of Aspacures III and the grandson (on his mother’s side) of Trdat. The Georgian chronicles criticizes him for impiety and neglect of religious building, and informs us that he opposed both major regional powers, the Roman and Sassanid empires. Defeated by the Sassanid army, he was captured and deported to Iran, where he died.

References

Chosroid kings of Iberia
5th-century monarchs in Asia
Prisoners and detainees of the Sasanian Empire
Georgians from the Sasanian Empire